Hellboy: Seed of Destruction is the first Hellboy comic book mini-series, published by Dark Horse Comics. It was conceived and illustrated by Mike Mignola and scripted by John Byrne. The comic served as the basis for the 2004 film Hellboy, directed by Guillermo del Toro.

Plot

Part One

The comic opens in 1944, with a report from a U.S. Army official named George Whitman, who has been ordered to lead a team of commandos to the (fictional) village of East Bromwich in the English Midlands. The army group (accompanied by a Nazi-fighting superhero named The Torch of Liberty) is under the guidance of three paranormal officials, one of whom is a young Trevor Bruttenholm. According to the group psychic, one Lady Cynthia Eden-Jones, a terrible event is to take place in a local ruined church; a doomsday project orchestrated by the Nazis, which could herald the end of the world. 

However, the actual rite is taking place at Tarmagant Island, a small island off the coast of Scotland. The Nazis have set up an array of strange machines around a stone circle, in the center of which stands the fabled Russian psychic Grigori Rasputin. The wizard, armed with a pair of powerful gauntlets, attempts to summon the Ogdru Jahad from their prisons to the earth. Although unseen, the beasts are referred to as "knowing no care" and "heralds of pestilence", marking them out as amoral, dangerous entities.

Although the Ogdru Jahad are not summoned, a boy-like, red-skinned demon appears at the Church in East Bromwich, and is soon dubbed "Hellboy" by Professor Bruttenholm. Whilst the leader of the Nazi operation, Klaus Werner von Krupt, is dismayed at Rasputin's apparent lack of success, the mad monk knows otherwise and proclaims he has set into motion the world's ending.  

The scene then changes to 1994, at the headquarters of the Bureau for Paranormal Research and Defense in Connecticut. A much older Bruttenholm is recounting the incident of Hellboy's "birth", when the demon himself enters the office. It is revealed that Bruttenholm has been missing for two years, having disappeared after a polar expedition. He tells Hellboy the story of his recent disappearance, informing him of his trip to the Arctic circle with "the three Cavendish boys", and a man named Sven Olafssen, who is a "renowned Arctic explorer". The quartet entered a cave at the top of the world, which bore a strange Lovecraftian statue of a tentacled creature, and a human meditating at its feet. When Bruttenholm touched the relic, it seemed to come alive, and he can barely remember the events that followed. Before he can continue, he is interrupted by a plague of frogs, and runs from the office, giving his adopted son the final words of "Save yourself!".

Before Hellboy can react, Bruttenholm is killed by a huge amphibioid monster, leaving him with hole-like markings around his dried-out corpse. The creature attempts to kill Hellboy, but he proves too strong for the frog-monster and is able to shoot it as it attempts to escape. After killing the creature, Hellboy telephones the B.P.R.D Director Tom Manning, informing him of Bruttenholm's death. As Manning arranges things with his fellow officials, the scene changes to the interior of an old Victorian house, whilst a dark, shadowed figure discusses Bruttenholm's death with a stately old woman. As the comic ends, a frog is seen in her teacup...

Part Two

Having discovered some clues pertaining to the death of the Professor, Hellboy journeys to an old house named Cavendish Hall, along with his colleagues Liz Sherman and Abe Sapien. Lady Emma Cavendish, the woman who owns the house, is recognisable as the woman from the end of the previous chapter. She explains that she is the final heir of Cavendish Hall, her sons having apparently died on their expedition with Bruttenholm. She also notes that her sons had not been the first males of the Cavendish line to try to find the cave; every group of males for nine generations has died trying to find it. The practice began with a sailor named Elihu Cavendish, a gentleman and whaler who had travelled the world and heard exotic stories in numerous ports. He had made it his life's goal to find the temple at the north pole, and, with his failure, every male of the following generations tried to accomplish his feat. Lady Cavendish confides in the trio her sadness at being the last living member of her family, and hopes that when she dies Cavendish Hall will sink into the lake below.

The butler then escorts the trio to their separate rooms. With Lady Cavendish alone, the shadowy figure returns and informs her he will reunite her with her sons, telling them to emerge with the line "Children, come and kiss your mother goodnight..." 

Deciding to begin their investigation, Abe removes his costume and dives out of the window, hoping to find something in the watery depths below the house. Hellboy then calls Liz on an internal line, and they discuss how the butler looked exactly like Sven Olafssen, the Arctic explorer who had supposedly died during the expedition with Bruttenholm and the Cavendish brothers. A group of frogs suddenly appear in Liz's room, and when she mentions this to Hellboy, he yells at her to get out of the room immediately, running toward her room himself.

Hellboy arrives at the room to find Liz gone; however, Olafssen is in the hall, feigning ignorance as to where she has vanished. When Hellboy threatens the explorer into talking, he transforms into a frog-monster, and the two fight through the house. After apparently killing the second monster, Hellboy returns to the sitting room and finds Lady Cavendish dead, covered in markings similar to those which adorned Bruttenholm's dead body. He regrets not having done something to protect her, but the dark individual seen earlier emerges and reveals himself to be Rasputin. Reunited with Hellboy, he tells him that it was he who had summoned him from the void, and also that it is Hellboy's destiny to help him destroy the world. Before he can retreat, a set of large tentacles smash through the floorboards and drag Hellboy to the cavernous depths below the house.

Part Three

In the darkness beneath Cavendish Hall—which is revealed to be an Aztec temple—Rasputin begins lecturing Hellboy on the nature of the Ogdru Jahad, and their desire to be free from their prison. Hellboy quickly becomes impatient and shoots Rasputin in the head, but the monk quickly heals and utters a curse which sends Hellboy flying through the air. This worries the demon, as this means his cadre of charms, amulets, relics, etc. are no use against Rasputin's power. The wizard warns Hellboy that he brought him into the world, and he can just as easily take him out of it. The Olafssen frog monster then returns, and begins battling anew with Hellboy.

Meanwhile, Abe has ventured through the waterways which connect the cellars and caverns of Cavendish Hall to the lake. In the caves, he comes across the two Cavendish brothers, who have themselves become frog-monsters; however, they are not as violent as Olafssen, and are instead seen embracing the corpse of their mother, who they killed under Rasputin's orders. Venturing further, Abe discovers the body of Elihu Cavendish, kept on a throne-like chair and bearing a harpoon in his hand.

Back in the temple, Rasputin reveals his connection with the Ogdru Jahad. Having been killed by a group of nobles in 1916 and his body flung into the River Neva, Rasputin was brought back to life by the Ogdru Jahad, and he left Russia, seeking solace in an Italian village, gathering reputation as prophet of the apocalypse. He was soon visited by Heinrich Himmler, who took him to Germany to head one of Hitler's various desperate "Doomsday Projects". Although Rasputin knew Hitler was doomed to failure, he also knew he could use the money, scientific minds, and technological resources of the Third Reich to broaden his ambitions. He aligned himself with Karl Ruprecht Kroenen, Ilsa Haupstein, Leopold Kurtz, and others, designing a machine that would bring the Ogdru Jahad to earth and burn it to cinders.

When the project failed and the group disbanded, Rasputin headed northward, receiving a vision from Sadu Hem (the statue-creature found by Bruttenholm, which was now in the temple beneath Cavendish Hall). The monk went into a deep meditation and saw the Ogdru Jahad in the abyss. After being re-awoken by Bruttenholm's touch, he accessed the Professor's memories and, by lucky chance, discovered Hellboy's existence. Using his renewed powers, he mind-controlled the expeditionary group to place Sadu Hem on board a ship and take him to America, the creature feeding upon everyone on board. He also allowed a maddened Bruttenholm to return to New York, knowing this would be excellent bait to lure Hellboy into a trap.

Rasputin then reveals he had Olafssen capture Liz, and now plans to channel her powers through himself and into Sadu Hem, who will in turn use this energy to unlock the crystal cocoons of the Ogdru Jahad. He now no longer needs Hellboy, and proclaims that hell on earth is approaching.

Part Four
As Liz's power flows into Sadu Hem, the Ogdru Jahad are seen rumbling in their prisons. An unknown alien race is seen observing the events, fearing that "the Seven" will devour the universe once they have blackened the earth. Hellboy continues to battle with Olafssen, before finding a concussion grenade and forcing it down his throat, apologizing to whatever little human sense remains in the creature. 

Rasputin rejoices in his nearing victory, reciting the same spell he had used fifty years ago in his attempt to summon the creature. However, before he completes the spell, he is speared through the chest by Abe, who is under the possession of a vengeful Elihu Cavendish. With the monk's concentration broken, Liz's fire-power becomes uncontrollable, frying Sadu Hem and causing the cavern to collapse. Abe awakens from Cavendish's control and leaps forward to save Liz, before greeting Hellboy and then carrying Liz out a nearby staircase.

A furious Rasputin then attempts to kill Hellboy, but, the majority of his power spent, he is unable to do so. He tries to blackmail the demon, telling him that, if he kills him, he will never know his true purpose. Hellboy smashes Rasputin's skull with his giant right hand, and runs up the staircase, before leaving the hall and watching it sink into the lake. Abe and Liz try to quiz him on what happened in the cave, as well as the identity of the wizard, but Hellboy is reluctant to inform them. 

As Hellboy recalls the monk's last words, the scene changes to an abandoned castle in Norway, which bears the ruins of an old, esoteric Nazi laboratory. The figures of Kroenen, Ilsa and Kurtz — Rasputin's old disciples — are seen frozen into the wall in a thick sheet of ice. However, a nearby device blinks into life, and the ice begins to crack...

Post-release

Collected editions
It was collected as the first Hellboy trade paperback, which has been reissued and published as a limited edition hardcover. The collection also includes the first two Hellboy short stories from San Diego Comic Con Comics #2 and Comics Buyer's Guide #1070 and a gallery of pinups from Simon Bisley, Mike Allred, Art Adams, Frank Miller, Fred Blanchard, and Gary Gianni.

Seed of Destruction (Dark Horse Comics, TPB, 128 pages, 1994, 2004, hardcover, 1995)

Awards
 1995:
 Won "Best Graphic Album: Reprint" Eisner Award
 Won "Best Writer/Artist" Eisner Award, for Mike Mignola

Film adaptation
Elements of the comic were adapted into the 2004 film Hellboy, directed by Guillermo del Toro.

Notes

References

External links 
Dark Horse profile of issue #1
Review of the trade , Comics Bulletin
The Hellboy Archive

1994 comics debuts
Hellboy titles
Fantasy comics
Eisner Award winners
Cultural depictions of Grigori Rasputin
Comics about Nazi Germany
Comics set during World War II